Dilruk Jayasinha (born 30 January 1985) is a Sri Lankan Australian comedian, actor and former accountant.

Early life
Jayasinha relocated to Melbourne to attend university, before working for a major accounting firm.  It was at this time that he realised his heart was not in accounting, but in comedy.

Career
Jayasinha has appeared on television programs Sammy J & Randy in Ricketts Lane, Live on Bowen, My Life Is Murder, The Project, All Star Family Feud, Celebrity Name Game, Have You Been Paying Attention? and Hughesy, We Have a Problem, as well performing at the Melbourne International Comedy Festival.

He is known for his role as Ashan on the ABC TV series Utopia.

In 2019, Jayasinha toured his comedy show Cheat Days. He was also the host of the 2019 Antenna Awards, honouring the best in Australian community television.

In 2020, Jayasinha appeared in the sixth season of the Australian version of I'm a Celebrity...Get Me Out of Here! and was eliminated first. He then toured his new comedy show Victorious Lion.

In 2021, Jayasinha appeared in the second series of Celebrity MasterChef Australia.

Podcasting 
Jayasinha co-hosts a weekly podcast Fitbet, along with fellow comedian Ben Lomas since February 2018. The podcast began as a bet between the two to see who first could get under 100kg with the winner receiving $1,000. Episodes discuss various aspects of weight loss and mental health, interviewed guests are usually fellow comedians who discuss their own journey. 

Jayasinha has successfully been able to lose nearly 50kg over the last 2 years, having started around 135kg.

Jayasinha has also recorded the podcast Dilruk's Mad Stacks, where he discusses his past as an accountant, the financial world, and money issues with Ed Kavalee.

Awards
In 2018, he won the Logie Award for Most Popular New Talent.

References

External links
 
Fitbet Podcast

Australian television personalities
Australian male actors
Australian male comedians
Living people
Logie Award winners
Place of birth missing (living people)
1985 births
I'm a Celebrity...Get Me Out of Here! (Australian TV series) participants